Kobe Emilio Perez (born April 10, 1997) is an American professional soccer player who currently plays as a midfielder for South Georgia Tormenta in USL League One.

Career

High school

Perez played three years for the Dalton High Catamounts. The Catamounts went 64-0-1 in 65 games, outscoring their opponents 367–31 in the process and winning three consecutive state titles.

College & amateur
Following high school, Perez played four years of collegiate soccer at Mercer University. As a creative attacking midfielder, he made 60 appearances for the Bears, aiding Mercer in back-to-back NCAA Tournament appearances in 2016 & 2017, and securing a Southern Conference championship in 2018.

Following college, Perez made his summer league debut for USL League Two side South Georgia Tormenta 2. Perez was instrumental during Tormenta 2's inaugural season. T2 trounced  USL League One professional side Chattanooga Red Wolves in the U.S. Open Cup 3–0, then captured  the League Two Southern Conference Championship, and advanced to the USL 2 National  Semifinals.

Professional
On August 1, 2019, Perez signed a two-month summer contract with USL League One side South Georgia Tormenta.

On January 14, 2020,  Perez was signed  by USL League One expansion side Union Omaha.

On August 7, 2020, Perez left Union Omaha by mutual agreement with the club.

Perez re-joined USL League One side South Georgia Tormenta on January 12, 2021.

References

External links
 
 Profile at Mercer University Athletics

1997 births
Living people
American soccer players
American people of Guatemalan descent
American sportspeople of North American descent
Sportspeople of Guatemalan descent
Association football midfielders
Soccer players from Georgia (U.S. state)
Tormenta FC players
USL League One players
USL League Two players
Mercer Bears men's soccer players
People from Dalton, Georgia
Union Omaha players